Haicheng Township is a township under the administration of Pingguo, Guangxi, China. , it has 16 villages under its administration.
Nahai Village
Guiliang Village
Rongfang Village
Shizhao Village
Fushan Village
Baitan Village
Gaole Village
Xingji Village
Xinmin Village
Dingti Village
Yongliang Village
Yongqi Village
Wankang Village
Liuzuo Village
Xionglie Village
Xiongxing Village

References 

Townships of Guangxi
Pingguo
Towns and townships in Baise